Simón Bolívar is a town in Ecuador, located in the Guayas Province.  It is the capital of Simón Bolívar Canton.

References

Populated places in Guayas Province